Olle Boström (born 19 November 1990) is a Swedish orienteering competitor. He placed sixth in the long course at the 2011 World Orienteering Championships in Chambéry, and won a bronze medal with the Swedish relay team.

He won two gold medals in the relay with the Swedish team at the Junior World Orienteering Championships, in  2008 and 2009.

References

External links

1990 births
Living people
Swedish orienteers
Male orienteers
Foot orienteers
World Orienteering Championships medalists
Junior World Orienteering Championships medalists